Mahamid (also Romanized as Maḩāmīd; also known as Maḩāmed) is a village in Shahid Modarres Rural District, in the Central District of Shushtar County, Khuzestan Province, Iran. At the 2006 census, its population was 214, in 45 families.

References 

Populated places in Shushtar County